Soviet-Japanese War may refer to:
 Soviet–Japanese border conflicts (1938–39)
Battle of Lake Khasan (1938)
Battles of Khalkhin Gol (1939) 
 Soviet–Japanese War (1945)
Soviet invasion of Manchuria (1945) (also sometimes referred to as "Operation August Storm")

See also
 Empire of Japan–Russian Empire relations (1855–1922)
 Russo-Japanese War (1904–05)
 Japan–Soviet Union relations (1922–91)
 Japan–Russia relations (1991-present)
 Soviet–Japanese Basic Convention (1925)
 Soviet–Japanese Neutrality Pact (1941)
 Soviet–Japanese Joint Declaration of 1956